Carignan-de-Bordeaux (literally Carignan of Bordeaux) is a commune in the Gironde department in Nouvelle-Aquitaine in southwestern France. Château Beaugey is located within the commune.

Population

See also
Communes of the Gironde department

References

Communes of Gironde